Sri Lanka competed at the 2016 Summer Olympics in Rio de Janeiro, Brazil, from 5 to 21 August 2016. This was the nation's seventeenth appearance at the Summer Olympics, with the exception of the 1976 Summer Olympics in Montreal. Six of the nation's Olympic editions were previously designated as Ceylon.

The National Olympic Committee of Sri Lanka sent a team of nine athletes, seven men and two women, to compete in six different sports at the Games, matching the nation's roster size with Atlanta two decades earlier. Three Sri Lankan athletes previously competed in London, including rifle shooter Mangala Samarakoon and badminton player Niluka Karunaratne. Meanwhile, veteran marathon runner Anuradha Cooray, who attended his third Olympics as the oldest and most experienced participant (aged 38), was selected by the committee to carry the Sri Lankan flag at the opening ceremony.

Sri Lanka, however, did not earn any Olympic medals in Rio de Janeiro; the nation's last medal was awarded to sprinter Susanthika Jayasinghe, who won silver in the women's 200 metres at the 2000 Summer Olympics in Sydney.

Athletics (track and field)
 
Sri Lanka qualified three athletes, two male and one female.
Key
Note–Ranks given for track events are within the athlete's heat only
Q = Qualified for the next round
q = Qualified for the next round as a fastest loser or, in field events, by position without achieving the qualifying target
NR = National record
N/A = Round not applicable for the event
NM = No mark

Track & road events

Field events

Badminton

Sri Lanka received an invitation from the Tripartite Commission to send London 2012 Olympian Niluka Karunaratne in the men's singles event.

Judo
 
Sri Lanka received an invitation from the Tripartite Commission to send a judoka competing in the men's lightweight category (73 kg), signifying the nation's Olympic debut in the sport.

Shooting

Sri Lanka received an invitation from the Tripartite Commission to send a men's rifle shooter to the Olympics, as long as the minimum qualifying score (MQS) was met by March 31, 2016.

Qualification Legend: Q = Qualify for the next round; q = Qualify for the bronze medal (shotgun)

Swimming
 
Sri Lanka received a Universality invitation from FINA to send one female swimmer, to the Olympics. Matthew Abeysinghe is also scheduled to represent the country, after meeting the B standard time at a qualification meet in July 2016. Abeysinghe was the first swimmer ever from Sri Lanka to meet the qualification standard for the Olympics.

Weightlifting

Sri Lanka received an unused quota place from IWF to send a male weightlifter, signifying the nation's return to the sport after an eight-year hiatus.

See also
Sri Lanka at the 2016 South Asian Games
Sri Lanka at the 2016 Summer Paralympics

References

External links 

 

Olympics
Nations at the 2016 Summer Olympics
2016